"Christopher Columbus" is a song by British-Norwegian boyband A1, released as the third single from their fifth studio album, Rediscovered. The track inspired the band to name the album Rediscovered, as the given title was the name of one of the greatest explorers in the world, Christopher Columbus. The title of this track and the album link to one another. No music video was created for the track.

Track listing
 Digital download
 "Christopher Columbus" (Radio Edit) - 3:23
 "Christopher Columbus" (Live at Tønsbergmessa, May 2013) - 3:52
 "Trust Me" (Live at Tønsbergmessa, May 2013) - 3:47
 "In Love and I Hate It" (Live at Tønsbergmessa, May 2013) - 5:09

 CD single
 "Christopher Columbus" - 3:23
 "Be the First to Believe" (Live at Tønsbergmessa, May 2013) - 2:37
 "Ready or Not" (Live at Tønsbergmessa, May 2013) - 4:02
 "Same Old Brand New You" (Live at Tønsbergmessa, May 2013) - 4:24

References

2013 singles
2013 songs
A1 (band) songs
Songs about Christopher Columbus
Songs written by Ben Adams
Songs written by Mark Read (singer)